The red-faced cisticola (Cisticola erythrops) is a species of bird in the family Cisticolidae. It is widely present across sub-Saharan Africa (rare in southern Africa). Its natural habitats are subtropical or tropical seasonally wet or flooded lowland grassland and swamps.

The race C. e. lepe, found in Angola and possibly the southeast of the Democratic Republic of Congo, is sometimes regarded as a separate species, the Lepe cisticola.

Gallery

References

red-faced cisticola
Birds of Sub-Saharan Africa
red-faced cisticola
Taxonomy articles created by Polbot